The 2019 Castilian-Leonese regional election was held on Sunday, 26 May 2019, to elect the 10th Cortes of the autonomous community of Castile and León. All 81 seats in the Cortes were up for election. The election was held simultaneously with regional elections in eleven other autonomous communities and local elections all throughout Spain, as well as the 2019 European Parliament election.

The Spanish Socialist Workers' Party (PSOE) saw its first plurality in a regional election in Castile and León since 1983, being only the second time in history that the party emerged as the most voted political force in a regional election. Conversely, support for the governing People's Party (PP) collapsed into the worst historical showing for the party, whereas the liberal Citizens (Cs) and the far-right Vox made substantial gains at its expense, though support for the latter, which rose from 0.7% to 5.5%, failed to materialize in more than one single seat due to the electoral system. Concurrently, the Podemos–Equo alliance suffered a sizeable setback after losing eight out of the ten seats Podemos had won on its own in 2015.

As a result of PP and Cs being able to muster a slim majority of 41 seats in the Cortes, the two centre-right parties were able to form a coalition government—the second in the community's history, after the coalition between the PP and the late Democratic and Social Centre (CDS) that was formed for the 1989–1991 period—under PP candidate Alfonso Fernández Mañueco, who became the region's new president.

Overview

Electoral system
The Cortes of Castile and León were the devolved, unicameral legislature of the autonomous community of Castile and León, having legislative power in regional matters as defined by the Spanish Constitution and the Castilian-Leonese Statute of Autonomy, as well as the ability to vote confidence in or withdraw it from a regional president.

Voting for the Cortes was on the basis of universal suffrage, which comprised all nationals over 18 years of age, registered in Castile and León and in full enjoyment of their political rights. Additionally, Castilian-Leonese people abroad were required to apply for voting before being permitted to vote, a system known as "begged" or expat vote. All members of the Cortes of Castile and León were elected using the D'Hondt method and a closed list proportional representation, with an electoral threshold of three percent of valid votes—which included blank ballots—being applied in each constituency. Seats were allocated to constituencies, corresponding to the provinces of Ávila, Burgos, León, Palencia, Salamanca, Segovia, Soria, Valladolid and Zamora, with each being allocated an initial minimum of three seats, as well as one additional member per each 45,000 inhabitants or fraction greater than 22,500.

The use of the D'Hondt method might result in a higher effective threshold, depending on the district magnitude.

Election date
The term of the Cortes of Castile and León expired four years after the date of their previous election, unless they were dissolved earlier. The election decree was required to be issued no later than the twenty-fifth day prior to the date of expiry of parliament and published on the following day in the Official Gazette of Castile and León (BOCYL), with election day taking place between the fifty-fourth and sixtieth days from publication. The previous election was held on 24 May 2015, which meant that the legislature's term would have expired on 24 May 2019. The election decree was required to be published in the BOCYL no later than 30 April 2019, with the election taking place up to the sixtieth day from publication, setting the latest possible election date for the Cortes on Saturday, 29 June 2019.

The president had the prerogative to dissolve the Cortes of Castile and León and call a snap election, provided that no motion of no confidence was in process and that dissolution did not occur either during the first legislative session or before one year had elapsed since a previous dissolution. In the event of an investiture process failing to elect a regional president within a two-month period from the first ballot, the Cortes were to be automatically dissolved and a fresh election called.

Parliamentary composition
The Cortes of Castile and León were officially dissolved on 2 April 2019, after the publication of the dissolution decree in the Official Gazette of Castile and León. The table below shows the composition of the parliamentary groups in the Cortes at the time of dissolution.

Parties and candidates
The electoral law allowed for parties and federations registered in the interior ministry, coalitions and groupings of electors to present lists of candidates. Parties and federations intending to form a coalition ahead of an election were required to inform the relevant Electoral Commission within ten days of the election call, whereas groupings of electors needed to secure the signature of at least one percent of the electorate in the constituencies for which they sought election, disallowing electors from signing for more than one list of candidates.

Below is a list of the main parties and electoral alliances which contested the election:

Campaign

Election debates
Since a 2017 reform, the electoral law of Castile and León provided for the presidential candidates of the parties having a parliamentary group in the Cortes to participate in, at least, two electoral debates to be held during the electoral campaign.

Opinion polls
The tables below list opinion polling results in reverse chronological order, showing the most recent first and using the dates when the survey fieldwork was done, as opposed to the date of publication. Where the fieldwork dates are unknown, the date of publication is given instead. The highest percentage figure in each polling survey is displayed with its background shaded in the leading party's colour. If a tie ensues, this is applied to the figures with the highest percentages. The "Lead" column on the right shows the percentage-point difference between the parties with the highest percentages in a poll.

Voting intention estimates
The table below lists weighted voting intention estimates. Refusals are generally excluded from the party vote percentages, while question wording and the treatment of "don't know" responses and those not intending to vote may vary between polling organisations. When available, seat projections determined by the polling organisations are displayed below (or in place of) the percentages in a smaller font; 41 seats were required for an absolute majority in the Cortes of Castile and León (43 until 10 January 2018).

Voting preferences
The table below lists raw, unweighted voting preferences.

Results

Overall

Distribution by constituency

Aftermath

Notes

References
Opinion poll sources

Other

2019 in Castile and León
Castile and León
Regional elections in Castile and León
May 2019 events in Spain